The Mandovi Express is a train which operates between Chhatrapati Shivaji Maharaj Terminus and , the main railway station in Goa and is currently operated by the Central Railway and the Konkan Railway. This train is named after the Mandovi River.This train is also called "The Food Queen of Konkan Railways",by railfans.

Background
In previous years before the Konkan Railway came into existence, it used to run between Vasco and Miraj as the Vasco-Miraj MG train and after the Konkan Railway came into existence, it was diverted and made to run from Mumbai to Madgaon and renamed Mandovi Express by then Railway Minister Nitish Kumar.

Service
It runs daily with a total travel time of 11 hours and 50 minutes. It has 18 stops on its route.

Routes
The Mandovi Express (10103/4) runs from Chhatrapati Shivaji Maharaj Terminus (CSMT) with stoppages at-
Dadar central 
Thane
Panvel Junction 
Mangaon
Khed 
Chiplun
Sangameshwar Road railway 
Ratnagiri 
Adavali
Rajapur road
Vaibhavwadi road 
Kankavali 
Sindhudurg road
Kudal
Sawantwadi Road
Pernem
Thivim  
Karmali
Madgaon

Locomotive
In earlier years it used to run with WDM-3A or WDM-3D of Kalyan/Erode shed and in 2022 it was given WAP-4 of [[Electric Loco Shed,  . It is now hauled by a WAP-4 of [[Electric Loco Shed,

Incident
On 7 Oct 2013, Mandovi Express derailed at Khed which lies in Ratnagiri district. This incident happened when the train was running slowly and going towards Khed railway station, so no casualties reported.

References

Sister trains
 Lokmanya Tilak Terminus–Karmali AC Superfast Express
 Dadar–Madgaon Jan Shatabdi Express
 Konkan Kanya Express
 Mumbai CSMT–Karmali Tejas Express
 Lokmanya Tilak Terminus–Madgaon AC Double Decker Express 
 

Named passenger trains of India
Rail transport in Mumbai
Transport in Margao
Railway services introduced in 1999
Konkan Railway
Rail transport in Maharashtra
Rail transport in Goa